Carex illota is a species of sedge known by the common name sheep sedge. It is native to western North America, where it grows in wet places such as marshes and mountain meadows, from New Mexico and California north to Western Canada.

Description
This sedge produces dense clumps of stems up to about 38 centimeters in maximum height. There are a few leaves for each stem, growing up to 18 centimeters long. The nodding inflorescence is a dense dark brown cluster of spikes about a centimeter long.

References

External links
Jepson Manual Treatment - Carex illota
Flora of North America
Carex illota - Photo gallery

illota
Flora of the Western United States
Flora of Western Canada
Flora of the Sierra Nevada (United States)
Flora of California
Flora of New Mexico
Plants described in 1889
Flora without expected TNC conservation status
Taxa named by Liberty Hyde Bailey